Lamprocles was Socrates' and Xanthippe's eldest son.  His two brothers were Menexenus and Sophroniscus.  Lamprocles was a youth (μειράκιον meirakion) at the time of Socrates' trial and death.  According to Aristotle, Socrates' descendants as a whole turned out to be unremarkable "fools and dullards".

References

 Plato, Apology 34d; Phaedo 116b.
 Xenophon, Memorabilia, 2.2.1–14.
 Aristotle, Rhetoric, Book 2 Chapter 15 .

4th-century BC Athenians
Family of Socrates
5th-century BC births
4th-century BC deaths